John Dougherty Barbour JP DL (3 March 1824 – 1901) was an Irish industrialist and politician.  His middle name is sometimes written as "Doherty."

Born in Castle Street, Lisburn, County Antrim, the son of William Barbour, he entered the linen business (William Barbour & Sons) established by his grandfather in Lisburn.  His brother, Thomas Barbour, opened a branch of the firm in America.  Amongst Barbour's children were Sir Milne Barbour, Bt. and Helen Reilly Barbour, who married Thomas Andrews, designer of the RMS Titanic

Election controversy
In 1863, Barbour was elected Member of Parliament for Lisburn as a Liberal. Prior to this he had moved to his father's home, Hilden House, which he established as a place for entertainment.  In the 1863 election, 263 votes were placed in the Lisburn constituency.  A Petition was presented against Barbour and, by June, he had been unseated as MP.

In 1864 he married the daughter of John Milne of Edinburgh.  Barbour later lived in Leamington Spa, where he was elected mayor in 1891, and at Hilden House.

References
http://www.lisburn.com/books/historical_society/volume5/volume5-6.html

1824 births
1901 deaths
Irish Liberal Party MPs
Members of the Parliament of the United Kingdom for County Antrim constituencies (1801–1922)
UK MPs 1859–1865
Mayors of places in Warwickshire
People from Lisburn
People from Leamington Spa